Nathan Agmon (born Nathan Bistritzky; Russian Empire 1896 – Tel Aviv, 1980) was an Israeli writer and translator born in the Russian Empire.

Agmon came to Palestine in 1920, and was a member of the senior staff of the Jewish National Fund from 1922 till retirement in 1952.

He was best known for his dramatic works, including a libretto for Alexander Tansman on the false messiah Shabtai Tzvi, and a work on Judas Iscariot, as well as for being the first to translate the complete Don Quixote into Hebrew, in 1958.

Published works
Days and Nights (Yamim ve-lelot) 1926

See also
Hebrew literature

References

1896 births
1980 deaths
Soviet emigrants to Mandatory Palestine
People from Kiev Governorate
Spanish–Hebrew translators